Sami Repo (born 8 November 1971 in Simpele) is a Finnish former cross-country skier who competed from 1992 to 2004. He won a bronze medal in the 4 × 10 km relay at the 1998 Winter Olympics in Nagano. Repo's best individual finish also happened at Nagano with an 18th in the 10 km.

Repo's best finish at the Nordic skiing World Championships was 11th in the 10 km and the 10 km + 15 km combined pursuit events (both in 1999). He also won four FIS World Cup races in Finland as well (1993, 1995, 1997, 1998).

Cross-country skiing results
All results are sourced from the International Ski Federation (FIS).

Olympic Games
 1 medal – (1 bronze)

World Championships

World Cup

Season standings

Individual podiums

3 podiums

Team podiums
7 wins – (7 ) 
16 podiums – (15 , 1 )

References

External links
 
 
 

1971 births
Living people
People from Rautjärvi
Finnish male cross-country skiers
Cross-country skiers at the 1994 Winter Olympics
Cross-country skiers at the 1998 Winter Olympics
Cross-country skiers at the 2002 Winter Olympics
Olympic medalists in cross-country skiing
Medalists at the 1998 Winter Olympics
Olympic bronze medalists for Finland
Olympic cross-country skiers of Finland
Sportspeople from South Karelia